Vick may refer to:

Given name
 Vick Ballard (born 1990), American football player
 Vick King (born 1980), American football player

Surname
 Brandon Vick, American politician in the Washington House of Representatives
 Dick Vick (1892–1980), American football player
 Edward Vick, American naval officer, businessman, and volunteer worker for veterans' causes
 Edward R. Vick (born 1958), Managing Director of Vick Foundation
 Ernie Vick, (1900–1980), American football and baseball player
 George Beauchamp Vick (1901–1975), American Baptist pastor
 Godfrey Vick (1892–1958), English lawyer and judge
 Graham Vick (1953–2021), English opera director
 Harold Vick (1936–1987), American saxophonist and flautist
 James Vick (born 1987), American mixed martial artist
 LaGerald Vick (born 1997), American basketball player
 Marcus Vick (born 1984), American football player
 Michael Vick (born 1980), American football player
 Roger Vick (born 1964), American football player
 Sammy Vick (1895–1986), American baseball player
 Steve Vick (born 1956), American politician in the Idaho Senate
 Ted Vick (born 1972), American politician in the South Carolina House of Representatives
 Walker Whiting Vick (1878-1926), aide to Woodrow Wilson

Places
 Vick, Arkansas, United States
 Vick, Louisiana, United States

Other uses
 Karen Vick, a character on the American comedy detective drama Psych

See also
 VIC (disambiguation)
 Victor (disambiguation)
 Vicks